Beauprea is a genus of flowering plants in the family Proteaceae. Its 13 extant species are endemic to New Caledonia, though closely related forms have been found in the fossil records of Australia and New Zealand. Its closest extant relatives are the African Protea and Faurea.

Species
Described species include:
Beauprea asplenioides Schltr.
Beauprea balansae Brongn. & Gris
Beauprea comptonii S.Moore
Beauprea congesta Virot
Beauprea crassifolia Virot
Beauprea filipes Schltr.
Beauprea gracilis Brongn. & Gris
Beauprea montana (Brongn. & Gris) Virot
Beauprea montis-fontium Guillaumin
Beauprea neglecta Virot
Beauprea pancheri Brongn. & Gris
Beauprea penariensis Guillaumin
Beauprea spathulaefolia Brongn. & Gris

References

External links

 
Proteaceae genera
Endemic flora of New Caledonia
Taxonomy articles created by Polbot
Taxa named by Adolphe-Théodore Brongniart
Taxa named by Jean Antoine Arthur Gris